Robert Parry Nisbet JP DL (1793 – 31 May 1882) was a British public man. He was High Sheriff of Wiltshire in 1849, from 1852 a Deputy Lieutenant for the county, and Conservative Member of Parliament for Chippenham from a by-election in 1856 to the 1859 general election.

After an early career in the Indian Civil Service in Bengal, Nisbet settled at Southbroom House near Devizes, Wiltshire. In his Will, proved in 1882, he left the large fortune of £52,000, including property at Dinapore, India, to his family, £50 to be spent on coals and blankets for the poor of Southbroom, and £1 to each resident of the almshouses near the gates of his house.

Nisbet's grandson Douglas Robert Hadow (1846–1865) was killed in a mountaineering accident a few hours after taking part in the first ascent of the Matterhorn. Another grandson, Frank Hadow, won the Wimbledon championship in 1878.

References

External links 
 

1793 births
1882 deaths
High Sheriffs of Wiltshire
Conservative Party (UK) MPs for English constituencies
UK MPs 1852–1857
UK MPs 1857–1859
Deputy Lieutenants of Wiltshire
People from Devizes